Arsalan Alijani Monfared (Persian: ارسلان علیجانی منفرد, born September 21, 1980) is a Tabriz player and former coach of Iran's men's national ice hockey team. He is the founder, CEO, and an investor of the Sayman Sports Complex. He also has over a hundred provincial, national, and international championships in ice hockey and speed skating.

Participation in competitions and international title wins 
Monfared has been invited to the Japan National Team for speed skating since 2008 and has been a regular member of the National Hockey Team for two years and a national team coach for one year.

 2001 – Runner-up Speed Skating
 2005 – Member of Jockey National Team Hockey Team in South Korea Jianju Fifth Asian Player (player)
 2005 – Member of the Iranian Hockey skating team, sent to the Hong Kong World Club Championship and seventh place (player)
 2006 – Third place in the Iranian Hockey League
 2007 – Third place in the Iranian Hockey League
 2008 – Member of the Indian Hockey Team in the Asian Championships in India and third place (player)
 2010 – Member of the Silvan Hockey Skate Team, expeditions to the World Club Hong Kong Championships and won the fifth place (player)
 2010 – Vice President of Asian Hockey Skating Championship in China, Dalian City (player)
 2011 – Attending the Italian World Cup as the 15th player (player)
 2012 – Attend the Asian Championships in China and take third place in Asia
 2014 – Attending the German World Cup 16th place (player)
 2014 – Member of the Iranian hockey skating team in the French upper puck
 2016 – Attend the Asian Championships in China and take third place in Asia
 2018 – Attending the Turkish National Team (Coach)
2019 – Coaching the Mahoor Tabriz Carpet Team and winning the Championship in the National Skating Hockey League

Other activities 
In addition to playing sports, Monfared operates his own business. Monfared launched his own advertising company, Sarvin Advertising Center, in Year 2.

References

پیوند به بیرون 
 Signing of the first draft of cooperation between the Iranian Skating Federation and the Turkish Ice Hockey Federation
 اسکیت بازان آذربایجان شرقی در مسابقات رولر اسکیت قهرمانی آسیا حضور دارند
 اولین مرحله اردوی تیم ملی اسکیت هاکی آقایان در سال ۱۳۹۳

Living people
Iranian sportspeople
1980 births